Tension is the second studio album by Christian rock band Dizmas. It was released on Credential Recordings in 2007.

Track listing
"Jealousy Hurts" – 2:36
"Shake It Off" – 2:35
"Play It Safe" – 3:24
"If You Love Someone" – 4:00
"See Daylight" – 2:42
"Dance" – 2:10
"This Is A Warning" – 3:28
"The Voice Is Ghostly" – 3:12
"Nothing At All" – 7:24
"October" – 3:37
"Until You Rescued Me" – 3:36
"Sun" – 2:17

Personnel
 Zach Zegan – lead vocals
 Josh Zegan – guitar, backing vocals
 Jon Howard – guitar
 Clayton Hunt – drums
 Nick Aranda – bass guitar

External links
 Review on CCM Magazine

Dizmas albums
2007 albums
Credential Recordings albums